Kirill Aleksandrovich Tolmatsky (22 July 1983 – 3 February 2019), better known by his stage names Detsl (Russian: Децл) and Le Truk, was a Russian hip hop artist.

Biography 
The son of Russian media producer and creative director Alexandr Tolmatsky (born 12 May 1960), he was born in Moscow, graduated from the British International School and then studied in Switzerland where he was introduced to hip hop music by a roommate and decided to become a rapper himself. Upon his return to Moscow, he launched his solo career under the guidance and mentorship of his father who co-produced his debut and a follow-up record. During that time, he also collaborated with the hip hop collective Bad Balance.

He made his debut on the Russian rap scene in 1999 under the stage name  Detsl (a Russian slang word meaning 'a little, not much' from English "that's all", the only way to pronounce it with sounds available in Russian), releasing a track  Friday  along with a music video. In 2000, he released his debut album Who? You to massive success and quickly became a teen idol of the early 2000s in Russia. In 2001, his second album Street Fighter was released. Having performed for three years as  Detsl, he decided to distance himself from the early material, releasing his eponymous third record in 2004 as Le Truk. However, he returned to his previous stage name on the next two albums and used Detsl aka Le Truk moniker for all his releases starting from 2014.

Death
He died on 3 February 2019 in Izhevsk at the age of 35 from a sudden heart attack after performing his live set at a private birthday party. Coincidentally, he entertained the idea of faking his own death and disappearing at exactly the same age in the 2007 and 2015 interviews to news media agencies before the concert in the same city he would actually die in.
The last post on Instagram was his own picture, written in oil on canvas, the inscription on it reads: “RIP RGB”, and in the caption to the work explanation: conspiracy theory collection. 
The farewell ceremony was held on February 6 in Moscow at the Central Clinical Hospital of the Office of the Presidential Affairs. Tolmatsky was buried at the Pyatnitskoye Cemetery.

Discography

Who Are You? (2000)
 Party at Detsl's Home 
  All You Need Is Beat 
  Princess 
  Moscow-New York
  Who Are You? 
  Hope for Tomorrow 
  Tears 
  Black Serpent 
  12 Angry Viewers 
     Blood, My Blood 
  We're Chillin' 
 Friday

Street Fighter (2001)
  Street Fighter 
  Letter 
  Don't Try to Get rid of Me 
  In Love 
  Sea 
  Street Dogs 
  Rhymes in English 
  MC Fist 
  Politicians 
  Fiasco 
  No To War 
  8th Day of Spring

Le Truk (2004)
 Intro 
  Moscow 
 Skit 
  Rap Is 
 Skit Police 
  Legalize 
  Lets Puff Some 
 Skit Money 
  Bitches 
  Party #2 
 Represent  
 Rap For Real 
 Pizness 
 Skit Babylon Shall Fall 
 War in a Me Backyard  
  Love After Love 
  Personality 
  God Does Exist 
  Moscow (Remix) 
  Night  feat. Karina Serbina   
 Hidden Track

MosVegas 2012 (2008)
 Intro 
  Original Doctors 
  Dangerous 
   Integration 
  MosVegas Style 
 Street Music 
  Sweet Fog 
 I Have a Plan 
  One More Chance 
  Jah Unites Us 
 Wow
  Little Time Left!
 Outro 
  Time To Get It On 
 On and On 
 Just Movin’
 Track 17

Here and Now (2010)
  Beginning
  Warriors of Light
  Creators 
  Tired 
  Ice 
  This World 
   Be Yourself 
  Give Me 
  Astral 
 Calm Down 
 Hoolahoop 
 Dancehallmania 
 Criminal 
 Connection

Dancehall Mania (2014)

Chessgane (feat. Medicine Man)
Fire (feat DaVille)
Keep On Moving (feat, Check)
Party (feat Soul 4 Soul)
Superstar (Imal)
Call the Back Up (feat. Jah Bari)
Wake Up Caribbean (feat. Medicine Man, DaVille, Check, Soul 4 Soul, Imal & Jah Bari)
Wind & Grind (feat. Medicine Man, DaVille, Check, Soul 4 Soul, Imal & Jah Bari)
Confuse (feat. Soul 4 Soul) 
Give Me More (feat. Imal)
Dancehall Syndicate (feat. Medicine Man, DaVille, Check, Soul 4 Soul, Imal & Jah Bari)

References

External links
  Short biography (in Russian)

1983 births
2019 deaths
Russian hip hop
Russian rappers
Russian hip hop musicians
Rappers from Moscow
Russian child singers
20th-century Russian male singers
20th-century Russian singers
21st-century Russian male singers
21st-century Russian singers
Winners of the Golden Gramophone Award